This is the discography of Spanish beat group Los Bravos.

Albums

Studio albums

Compilation albums

Singles

Notes

References

Discographies of Spanish artists
Pop music group discographies
Rock music group discographies